USS Briscoe (APA-65) was a  that served with the United States Navy from 1944 to 1946. She was sunk as a target in 1948.

History
Briscoe was launched 19 June 1944 by Consolidated Steel at Wilmington, California, under a Maritime Commission contract; acquired by the Navy 29 October 1944; and commissioned the same day. She was named after Briscoe County in northwestern Texas.

World War II
Briscoe went through initial shakedown exercises off San Pedro, Los Angeles in November, 1944. Then, she loaded troops and cargo at Port Hueneme, California, and steamed to Pearl Harbor, where she arrived on 13 December and reported to the Commander, Naval Surface Forces Pacific (ComPhibPac), at Pearl Harbor Naval Station, as Transports-Assault (APA) class ship. She engaged in more training and shakedown exercises including, "gunnery, towing, night steaming, fueling at sea, damage control, and other operational and combat procedures" preparing for the invasion of Iwo Jima. In February 1945, she underwent repairs of her engineering plant missing the Battle of Iwo Jima. Repairs kept her grounded until 6 April 1945, when she joined the Transport Division (TransDiv) 51 and proceeded to shuttle troops and cargo between the Marshalls, Marianas, Philippines, Solomon Islands, and New Guinea, making a trip to San Francisco in May.

After hostilities
On 27 August 1945, after being delayed by a typhoon, Briscoe departed the Philippines for Japan. Upon arrival she joined the naval occupation forces and served primarily as a transport between the Philippine Islands and China. On 2 September 1945, she was present in Tokyo Bay during the Surrender of Japan formal ceremony passing past  in a convoy of Allied ships. Next day, she departed from Tokyo Bay with troops who were ordered to occupy the Tateyama naval air station. After that, she carried troops from Guam to Okinava, and later to northern China. Briscoe departed the Far East 30 November 1945 and returned to the United States. During the early months of 1946 she made several voyages between the ports of California and the Pacific islands as part of the so-called Magic Carpet Fleet, returning American troops to the United States.

Operation Crossroads
In the spring of 1946 Briscoe was assigned as a target ship for Operation Crossroads, the atomic bomb tests at Bikini Atoll. She survived two atomic blasts in the target area at Bikini on 1 and 25 July, but after tests was decommissioned and kept for two years for radiological and structural studies at Kwajalein. Her name was struck from the Naval Vessel Register on 13 July 1948.

References

External links

APA-65 Briscoe, Navsource Online

Gilliam-class attack transports
Transports of the United States Navy
World War II auxiliary ships of the United States
World War II amphibious warfare vessels of the United States
Briscoe County, Texas
Ships built in Los Angeles
1944 ships
Ships involved in Operation Crossroads
Ships sunk as targets
Maritime incidents in 1946
Maritime incidents in 1948